Sangee is an Indian Bengali-language romantic emotional drama film directed by Haranath Chakraborty. Featuring Jeet and Priyanka Trivedi in their second film together, it served as the Bengali remake of the 1998 Tamil film Kannedhirey Thondrinal. Silajit Majumder plays a crucial role in the film.

Plot
Bijay, the son of a prominent businessman from Siliguri, comes to Calcutta for his higher studies. At the Bidhannagar Road railway station, he has a chance meeting with Rupa. Bijay experiences what is termed "love at first sight" according to his mentor and maternal uncle Prabhu Mama. In spite of getting off on the wrong foot with a student, Rana, at his college, they become close friends after Bijay helps Rana fight off some goons. Although Bijay comes from a rich and affluent background, he is very down to earth, a fact that Rana appreciates.

Bijay pursues Rupa, unaware of the fact that Rupa is Rana's younger sister. An initially disinterested Rupa gradually falls in love with him too. However, upon hearing from Rana how a friend of his had betrayed him in the past- by eloping with his other sister on the day of her wedding- Bijay sacrifices his love for his friendship with Rana, fearing that Rana would think of his relationship with Rupa as a betrayal too.
Rupa, on the other hand, is unwilling to let go. Unable to change Bijay's mind, she watches helplessly as her family arranges for her wedding. Desperate, she consumes poison and is taken to the hospital, where all is revealed. Rana is touched by his friend's sacrifice and asks Bijay to accept his sister's hand in marriage.

Cast
 Jeet as Bijoy
 Ranjit Mallick as Prabhu mama
 Priyanka Trivedi as Rupa
 Silajit Majumder as Rana
 Anamika Saha as Rana & Rupa's Mother
 Kanchan Mullick as Bijay & Rana's Friend
 Sudip Mukherjee as Dipak
 Sumitra Mukherjee
 Sanghamitra Bandyopadhyay
 Rajesh Sharma
 Amarnath Mukhopadhyay
 Ramen Raychowdhury
 Pushpita Mukherjee
 Babul Supriyo as himself (Guest)

Soundtrack

The album was composed by S. P. Venkatesh for Sangee.
Mano, Anuradha Sreeram, Kavita Krishnamurthy and Babul Supriyo have given their voices for the album.

Critical reception
The Film did overall well at Box Office. Jeet's performance was critically acclaimed. Soundtrack of this film was superhit.

References

2003 films
2000s Bengali-language films
Bengali-language Indian films
Bengali remakes of Tamil films
Films scored by S. P. Venkatesh
Films directed by Haranath Chakraborty